Marjorie Francis Okell, later Harris (1 April 1908 – 3 October 2009) was an international track and field athlete from Great Britain. Her main event was the high jump in which she placed 6th at the 1934 Empire Games. She was also British Athletics Champion in high jump in 1929 and 1931. She later became a life-president of the Women's Amateur Athletic Association (of Great Britain), dying in 2009 aged 101 years.

References 

1908 births
2009 deaths
British female high jumpers
English female high jumpers
Commonwealth Games competitors for England
Athletes (track and field) at the 1934 British Empire Games
English centenarians
Women centenarians